André Derain (10 June 1880 – 8 September 1954) was a French artist, painter, sculptor and co-founder of Fauvism with Henri Matisse.

Biography

Early years
Derain was born in 1880 in Chatou, Yvelines, Île-de-France, just outside Paris. In 1895 he began to study on his own, contrary to claims that meeting Vlaminck or Matisse began his efforts to paint, and occasionally went to the countryside with an old friend of Cézanne's, Father Jacomin along with his two sons. In 1898, while studying to be an engineer at the Académie Camillo, he attended painting classes under Eugène Carrière, and there met Matisse. In 1900, he met and shared a studio with Maurice de Vlaminck and together they began to paint scenes in the neighbourhood, but this was interrupted by military service at Commercy from September 1901 to 1904. Following his release from service, Matisse persuaded Derain's parents to allow him to abandon his engineering career and devote himself solely to painting; subsequently Derain attended the Académie Julian.

Fauvism

Derain and Matisse worked together through the summer of 1905 in the Mediterranean village of Collioure and later that year displayed their highly innovative paintings at the Salon d'Automne. The vivid, unnatural colors led the critic Louis Vauxcelles to derisively dub their works as les Fauves, or "the wild beasts", marking the start of the Fauvist movement. In March 1906, the noted art dealer Ambroise Vollard sent Derain to London to produce a series of paintings with the city as subject. In 30 paintings (29 of which are still extant), Derain presented a portrait of London that was radically different from anything done by previous painters of the city such as Whistler or Monet. With bold colors and compositions, Derain painted multiple pictures of the Thames and Tower Bridge. These London paintings remain among his most popular work. Art critic T. G Rosenthal: "Not since Monet has anyone made London seem so fresh and yet remain quintessentially English. Some of his views of the Thames use the Pointillist technique of multiple dots, although by this time, because the dots have become much larger, it is rather more simply the separation of colours called Divisionism and it is peculiarly effective in conveying the fragmentation of colour in moving water in sunlight."

In 1907 art dealer Daniel-Henry Kahnweiler purchased Derain's entire studio, granting Derain financial stability. He experimented with stone sculpture and moved to Montmartre to be near his friend Pablo Picasso and other noted artists. Fernande Olivier, Picasso's mistress at the time, described Derain as:
Slim, elegant, with a lively colour and enamelled black hair. With an English chic, somewhat striking. Fancy waistcoats, ties in crude colours, red and green. Always a pipe in his mouth, phlegmatic, mocking, cold, an arguer.

At Montmartre, Derain began to shift from the brilliant Fauvist palette to more muted tones, showing the influence of Cubism and Paul Cézanne. (According to Gertrude Stein, Derain may have been influenced by African sculpture before the Picasso.) Derain supplied woodcuts in primitivist style for an edition of Guillaume Apollinaire's first book of prose, L'enchanteur pourrissant (1909). He displayed works at the Neue Künstlervereinigung in Munich in 1910, in 1912 at the secessionist Der Blaue Reiter and in 1913 at the seminal Armory Show in New York. He also illustrated a collection of poems by Max Jacob in 1912.

Towards a new classicism

At about this time Derain's work began overtly reflecting his study of the Old Masters. The role of color was reduced and forms became austere; the years 1911–1914 are sometimes referred to as his gothic period. In 1914 he was mobilized for military service in World War I and until his release in 1919 he would have little time for painting, although in 1916 he provided a set of illustrations for André Breton's first book, Mont de Piete.

After the war, Derain won new acclaim as a leader of the renewed classicism then ascendant. With the wildness of his Fauve years far behind, he was admired as an upholder of tradition. In 1919 he designed the ballet La Boutique fantasque for Diaghilev, leader of the Ballets Russes. A major success, it would lead to his creating many ballet designs.

The 1920s marked the height of his success, as he was awarded the Carnegie Prize in 1928 for his Still-life with Dead Game and began to exhibit extensively abroad—in London, Berlin, Frankfurt, Düsseldorf, New York City and Cincinnati, Ohio.

During the German occupation of France in World War II, Derain lived primarily in Paris and was much courted by the Germans because he represented the prestige of French culture. Derain accepted an invitation to make an official visit to Germany in 1941, and traveled with other French artists to Berlin to attend a Nazi exhibition of an officially endorsed artist, Arno Breker. Derain's presence in Germany was used effectively by Nazi propaganda, and after the Liberation he was branded a collaborator and ostracized by many former supporters.

A year before his death, he contracted an eye infection from which he never fully recovered. He died in Garches, Hauts-de-Seine, Île-de-France, France in 1954 when he was struck by a moving vehicle.

Derain's London paintings were the subject of a major exhibition at the Courtauld Institute from 27 October 2005 to 22 January 2006.

Works

Public collections
Among the public collections holding works by André Derain are:
 Museum of Fine Arts, Ghent, Gent
 Museum de Fundatie, Zwolle, Netherlands

References

Further reading
Clement, Russell (1994). Les Fauves: A Sourcebook. Greenwood Press. .
Cowling, Elizabeth; Mundy, Jennifer (1990). On Classic Ground: Picasso, Léger, de Chirico and the New Classicism 1910–1930. London: Tate Gallery. 
Diehl, Gaston (1977). Derain. Crown Publishers, Inc. .
Hamilton, George Heard (1993). Painting and Sculpture in Europe, 1880–1940. Yale University Press. .
Sotriffer, Kristian (1972). Expressionism and Fauvism. McGraw-Hill. .

External links

André Derain at the National Gallery of Art
 
 Works by André Derain (public domain in Canada)
André Derain exhibition catalogs
Gelett Burgess, "The Wild Men of Paris, Matisse, Picasso and Les Fauves", 1910, Architectural Record
André Derain, Museums and Public Art Galleries Worldwide, Artcyclopedia
 

 
1880 births
1954 deaths
19th-century French painters
20th-century French painters
20th-century male artists
Académie Julian alumni
Fauvism
French male painters
French sculptors
Modern painters
People from Chatou
People of Montmartre